People or Personnel is a critique of centralized power written by Paul Goodman and published by Random House in 1965.

An essay on anarchism in management described the book as being demonstrative of the "practical anarchism" epoch of the 1960s and 1970s.

References

Further reading 

 
 
 
 
 
 
 
 
 
 
 
 
 
 

1965 non-fiction books
Books about anarchism
Books about politics of the United States
American non-fiction books
English-language books
Random House books
Social commentary
Decentralization
Books by Paul Goodman